40 Acres and a Mule Filmworks is the production company of Spike Lee, founded in 1979. The order, issued in 1865 by General Sherman as "Special Field Order 15", was later revoked by Andrew Johnson, and the land was taken away from the freed slaves and returned to previous owners.

History
The company has produced all of Lee's films, starting in 1986 with She's Gotta Have It. After the success of films Do the Right Thing and Malcolm X, Lee expanded the 40 Acres and a Mule Filmworks brand by opening clothing stores with merchandise that bore the company's emblem. Lee has also done several collaborations with Nike, Eckō Unltd. and Brooklyn Denim.

40 Acres and a Mule Filmworks also has an advertising division with DDB called Spike DDB located in New York City. They have done Super Bowl, Nike and Lay's commercial spots.  They have produced commercials and music videos in addition to Lee's films. The company established a music branch, used to designate records, 40 Acres and a Mule Musicworks in 1993.

In the late 1980s, the company sought a partnership with Universal Pictures, which was reupped in September 1992, and stayed on for five years, which lasted until March 2, 1997, when it was moved to Columbia Pictures. Sam Kitt was named president of production at the Sony-based studio on June 18, 1997.

In 2004, the company moved all of its operations  to New York City with headquarters on South Elliott Place in the Fort Greene neighborhood of Brooklyn.

In December 2021, the company had signed a multi-year creative partnership with Netflix to develop their film and television projects.

Awards and honors  
 2010: Peabody Award for If God Is Willing and Da Creek Don't Rise

Filmography

Television
 A Huey P. Newton Story (2001)
 Good Fences (2003)
 When the Levees Broke (2006)
 Kobe Doin' Work (2009)
 If God Is Willing and da Creek Don't Rise (2010)
 She's Gotta Have It (2017–19)
 NYC Epicenters 9/11-2021½ (2021)

References

External links
 

1979 establishments in New York City
African-American cinema
American companies established in 1979
Companies based in Brooklyn
Film production companies of the United States
Mass media companies based in New York City
Mass media companies established in 1979
Spike Lee